The Escalada a Montjuïc (in Catalan, English: Scaling of Montjuïc, Spanish: Escalada a Montjuïc) was a one-day, two-stage road bicycle racing race held in Barcelona, Catalonia, Spain since 1965. It was held in the middle of October, as one of the final races in the European season. Since 2005, it was organised as a 1.2 category race as a part of the UCI Europe Tour. The event, organised by Esport Ciclista Barcelona, played host to number of races for women, veterans, young riders and elite men.

The elite men's race was split into two stages. The first stage was a criterium consisting of five laps around a five kilometre circuit. The second stage was an individual time trial up the slopes of Montjuïc, which is usually around ten kilometres. The elite men's race mainly attracted professional Spanish riders. Eddy Merckx holds the record for most wins with six victories between 1966 and 1975.

Winners

External links
Official website 

Cycle races in Catalonia
UCI Europe Tour races
Recurring sporting events established in 1965
1965 establishments in Spain
Sports competitions in Barcelona
Defunct cycling races in Spain
Recurring sporting events disestablished in 2007
2007 disestablishments in Spain